Quadratic is a collection of four science fiction works by Olaf Stapledon and Murray Leinster.  It was edited by William L. Crawford and published in 1953 by Fantasy Publishing Company, Inc. in an edition of 300 copies.  The book is an omnibus of Stapledon's Worlds of Wonder and Leinster's Murder Madness, created by combining unbound sheets from the publisher's previous editions of the two volumes.

Contents
 Death into Life, by Olaf Stapledon
 The Flames, by Olaf Stapledon
 Old Man in a New World, by Olaf Stapledon
 Murder Madness, by Murray Leinster

References

1953 short story collections
Science fiction anthologies
Fantasy Publishing Company, Inc. books